Amherstburg First Baptist Church is a predominantly black church in Amherstburg, Ontario, Canada. It was founded by Anthony Binga Sr. and other Amherstburg residents in 1838. It was constructed in 1848–1849, and became a principal stop on the Underground Railroad. Under the leadership of Reverend Binga Sr. the church was the Mother Church of the Amherstburg Regular Missionary Baptist Association.

It was designated a National Historic Site of Canada in 2012.

See also
Black church (about similar churches in the United States)

References

National Historic Sites in Ontario
Amherstburg, Ontario
Black Canadian culture in Ontario